Brian Tarantina (March 27, 1959 – November 2, 2019) was an American stage, screen, and television character actor born in New York City. He was known for his roles on such shows as One Life to Live, The Marvelous Mrs. Maisel, and Gilmore Girls.

Personal life
Tarantina was born in New York City on March 27, 1959, to father Frank William Tarantina and an unknown mother. He attended what is now the Fiorello H. LaGuardia High School of Music & Art and Performing Arts, where he then began to pursue an acting career.

Shortly after midnight on November 2, 2019, Tarantina was found dead at his home in the Hell's Kitchen neighborhood of Manhattan. At the time of his death, his publicist attributed the cause to "complications from a severe health crisis he experienced a few months [prior]." However, New York City Chief Medical Examiner report released in December 2019, stated that he died from an accidental overdose of fentanyl, heroin, cocaine and diazepam.

Stage appearances

Off-Broadway
Innocent Thoughts, Harmless Intentions (March 6, 1980 – March 30, 1980) - "Enzio 'Spats' Spadanti"
Angels Fall (October 17, 1982 – November 28, 1982) – "Salvatore (Zappy) Zappala"
Young Playwrights Festival (April 13, 1983 – May 1, 1983) – "Frank" (Third Street) / "TV Host" (The Birthday Present) 
Balm in Gilead (May 31, 1984 – January 6, 1985) - "David"
V & V Only (May 25, 1988 – July 3, 1988) – "Donny" 		

Source

Broadway
Angels Fall (January 22, 1983 – March 13, 1983) – "Salvatore (Zappy) Zappala"
Biloxi Blues (March 28, 1985 – June 28, 1986) – "Roy Selridge"
The Boys of Winter (December 1, 1985 – December 8, 1985) – "Prick"
Sacrilege (November 2, 1995 – November 19, 1995) – "Crackerjack"

Source

Filmography

Film

The Cotton Club (1984) – Vince Hood
Critical Condition (1987) – Tommy Pinto
The January Man (1989) – Cone
Uncle Buck (1989) – E. Roger Coswell
Runaway Dreams (1989) – Jay Carver
Born on the Fourth of July (1989) – Vet #2
Jacob's Ladder (1990) – Doug
The Saint of Fort Washington (1993) – Fred
Carlito's Way (1993) – Speller
The Jerky Boys: The Movie (1995) – Geno
Sweet Nothing (1995) – Dee Dee
Bed of Roses (1996) – Randy
The Associate (1996) – Eddie
Donnie Brasco (1997) – Bruno
Walking to the Waterline (1998) – Lucy 'Replacement'
Better Living (1998) – Danny
Roberta (1999) – Donald
Summer of Sam (1999) – Bobby Del Fiore
The Talented Mr. Ripley (1999) – Fighting Neighbor
The Photographer (2000) – Camera Salesman
Personal Velocity: Three Portraits (2002) – Pete Shunt
City by the Sea (2002) – Snake
Duane Hopwood (2005) – Mr. Alonso
Trust the Man (2005) – Crazy Hair Driver
Unconscious (2006) – Morelli
A Crime (2006) – Joe
The Brave One (2007) – Gun Store Clerk
Ghost Town (2008) – Ghost Cop
Motherhood (2009) – Opera Lover in Car
Knight and Day (2010) – Scrap Yard Man
Rob the Mob (2014) – Ronnie
Zarra's Law (2014) – Frankie Andreoli
#Lucky Number (2015) – Blue Collar Mafia
BlacKkKlansman (2018) – Officer Clay Mulaney
Breaking Brooklyn (2018) – Randy Davis
Ask for Jane (2018) – Angry Doctor
The Kitchen (2019) – Burns (final film role)

Television

One Life to Live (1968) – Lucky Lippman (1990–1991) / Ray Castillo (2004)
Resting Place (1986) - Sp4 Beyer
Miami Vice (1988) – Rickman
Oz (1997) – Ronald Poklewaldt 
NYPD Blue (1997) – Darin Gammel
Third Watch (1999) - James French
Now and Again S01E08 (1999) - Tommy Madden
The Sopranos (2001) – Mustang Sally
Gilmore Girls (2001–2002) – Bootsy
Law & Order: Criminal Intent (2005, 2009) - Vic Dayton / Johnny Di Rogga
The Black Donnellys (2007) – Vinnie Culiari
Law & Order: Special Victims Unit (2008) – Bill Jensen
Fringe (2008) - Nice Guy
Person of Interest (2013) – Seamus Yorke
The Blacklist (2013) – The Courier's Brother
Gilmore Girls: A Year in the Life (2016) – Bootsy
The Marvelous Mrs. Maisel (2017–2019) – Jackie

Video games
Ripper (1996) – Addict
Grand Theft Auto IV (2008) – The Crowd of Liberty City
Grand Theft Auto IV: The Lost and Damned (2009) – Angus Martin

References

External links
 
 
 

1959 births
2019 deaths
20th-century American male actors
21st-century American male actors
Accidental deaths in New York (state)
American male film actors
American male stage actors
American male television actors
American male video game actors
American male voice actors
American people of Italian descent
Cocaine-related deaths in New York (state)
Deaths by heroin overdose in New York (state)
Fiorello H. LaGuardia High School alumni
Male actors from New York City
People from Hell's Kitchen, Manhattan
Drug-related deaths in New York City